Robert Ioan Căruță (born 24 January 1996) is a Romanian professional footballer who plays as a midfielder.

References

External links
 
 

1996 births
Living people
People from Moinești
Romanian footballers
Association football midfielders
Liga I players
Liga II players
CSM Ceahlăul Piatra Neamț players
FC Rapid București players
CS Știința Miroslava players
AFC Dacia Unirea Brăila players
FK Bregalnica Štip players
FC Unirea Constanța players
Romanian expatriate footballers
Romanian expatriate sportspeople in North Macedonia
Expatriate footballers in North Macedonia